

Men's competition

Bantamweight (− 56 kg)

Featherweight (− 60 kg)

Lightweight (− 67.5 kg)

Middleweight (− 75 kg)

Light-heavyweight (− 82.5 kg)

Middle-heavyweight (− 90 kg)

Super-heavyweight (+ 90 kg)

Medal table

References 
  .